The Activist may refer to:

 The Activist (1969 film), an American drama film
 The Activist (2014 film), a French-American thriller film with Michael Spears

See also
 Activism
 The Activity
 Theodore Boone: The Activist